Pye Min (26 May 1619 – 14 April 1672) was king of Toungoo dynasty from 1661 to 1672. Pye Min was a son of King Thalun. During the reign of his brother Pindale, the Prince of Pyay (Prome) led the Burmese resistance against Southern Ming and Qing incursions.

King Pindale, however, lost his popularity and Pye was urged to take the throne. Pye staged a coup in 1661, overthrowing Pindale and crowning himself King of Ava.

Pye was determined to reduce the power of Yongli Emperor of Southern Ming at Sagaing and held a conference of Chinese officials. Yongli suspected this as an assassination trick and instead ordered his armies to clash with the Burmese. However, the Chinese were largely decimated. In 1662, the Qing armies invaded Burma and Pye Min decided to leave the last Ming Emperor to the Qing. Yongli Emperor was carried out of Burma.

There was a Mon rebellion around Martaban in 1661 and in 1662 Lan Na was invaded by the Siamese armies under King Narai who held the city temporarily. The rest of his reign were largely uneventful and Pye Min died in 1672, succeeded by his son Narawara.

Early life
The future king was born to King Thalun and a minor queen Khin Myat Hset of Pinya on 26 May 1619. The young prince received the title of Minye Kyawkhaung. He was appointed governor of Prome (Pyay or Pye) on 13 September 1650 (Tuesday, 4th waning of Tawthalin 1012 ME) by King Pindale.

References

Bibliography
 
 

Rulers of Toungoo
1672 deaths
1619 births
17th-century Burmese monarchs